Milium may refer to:

Milium (dermatology), a condition consisting of small cysts near the surface of the skin or on the roof of the mouth
Milium (plant), a genus of grasses